Latehar district  is one of the 24 districts of  Jharkhand state in eastern India, and Latehar town is the administrative headquarters of this district. This district is part of Palamu division.

Latehar district is situated on longitude 84° 31' E and 23° 44.4' N latitude. The area of the district is 3660 km², with a population of 726,978 (2011 census).

History
The territory covered by the present district became a part of Palamu district, when it formed on 1 January 1928. Latehar district was created on 4 April 2001 by separating the erstwhile Latehar subdivision of Palamu district. It is currently a part of the Red Corridor.

Geography
Latehar district has two of the highest waterfalls in Jharkhand – Lodh Falls and Lower Ghaghri Falls, along with several others.
Netarhat is hill station in the district.
Betla National Park and Mahuadanr Wolf Sanctuary is located in this District.

Politics 

 |}

Administration

Blocks/Mandals 

Latehar district consists of 9  blocks. The following are the list of the blocks in Latehar district:

Latehar Block
Chandwa Block
Balumath Block
Manika Block
Barwadih Block
Garu Block
Mahuadanar Block
Bariyatu Block
Herhanj Block

Economy
In 2006 the Indian government named Latehar one of the country's 250 most backward districts (out of a total of 640). It is one of the districts in Jharkhand currently receiving funds from the Backward Regions Grant Fund Programme (BRGF).

Divisions
There are 9 development blocks, namely Latehar, Chandwa, Balumath, Bariyatu, Herhanj, Manika, Barwadih, Garu and Mahuadanr

There are two Vidhan Sabha constituencies in this district: Manika and Latehar. Both are part of Chatra Lok Sabha constituency.

Tourism
 Netarhat
 Betla National Park
 Palamu fort
 Kechki Sangam
 Sarju Valley
 Lodh Falls
 Lower Ghaghri Falls
 Suga Bandh
 Mirchaiya Waterfall
 Jhunjhuniya waterfall
 Kanti Waterfall
 Datam Patam Waterfall
 Tapa Pahad
 Ugratara Temple

Demographics

According to the 2011 census Latehar district has a population of 726,978. Roughly equal to the nation of Bhutan or the US state of Alaska. This gives it a ranking of 499th in India (out of a total of 640). Its population growth rate over the decade 2001-2011 was 29.38%. Latehar has a sex ratio of 964 females for every 1000 males, and a literacy rate of 61.23%. Scheduled Castes and Scheduled Tribes made up 21.31% and 45.54% of the population respectively.

At the time of the 2011 Census of India, 40.6% of the population in the district spoke Hindi, 27.1% Sadri, 18.31% Kurukh, 6.04% Magahi and 5.09% Urdu as their first language.

See also
Districts of Jharkhand
 Palamu district
 Garhwa district

References

External links

 Latehar district website
 Latehar travel guide and maps

 
Districts of Jharkhand
2001 establishments in Jharkhand